The Symphony No. 3 by Arnold Bax was completed in 1929. It was dedicated to Sir Henry Wood and is perhaps the most performed and most immediately approachable of Bax's symphonies.

It was the first symphony Bax completed at the Station Hotel, Morar, in the West Highlands of Scotland. The first recording was by the Hallé Orchestra under John Barbirolli in 1944.

It is scored for 3 flutes (1 doubling piccolo), 2 oboes, 4 clarinets, 1 bass clarinet, 2 bassoons, 1 double bassoon, 4 horns, 3 trumpets, 3 trombones, tuba, timpani, bass drum, tenor drum, snare drum, tambourine, cymbals, gong, xylophone, glockenspiel, celesta, anvil, 2 harps and strings.

Unlike his first two symphonies the third is "gentle rather than somber in character, dominated by the spirit of Northern legends which, Bax acknowledges, influenced him subconsciously".

It is in three movements:

Lento moderato – Allegro moderato – Lento moderato – Allegro moderato
Lento
Moderato – Piu mosso – Tempo I – Epilogue

The opening movement begins with a soft bassoon solo which introduces the main melodic theme.  The clarinet then joins the bassoon, followed by other instruments of the woodwind section in a relatively short lento moderato opening section. An accelerando then introduces the allegro moderato section which is based upon the opening melody from the bassoon. There is a long slow section in the middle of the movement before the allegro moderato material eventually returns at the conclusion. Unusually, Bax calls for a single anvil strike at the climax of this movement (his original intention had been more conventional, with a cymbal clash).

The dreamy and calm second movement begins with a solo horn introducing the main motive. Throughout the movement there are many other brass solos (particularly trumpet), and the form of the movement is relatively simple. It closes peacefully and beautifully.

The finale opens with a gong and repeated notes from the strings and woodwinds, which is then transformed into the main theme. The mood is inescapably optimistic, as though to exorcise the dark and wild moods of the first and second symphonies. It ends in a famous, peaceful and beautiful epilogue which makes a suitable close to the journey of the first three symphonies—which are in many ways linked, and are a cycle of their own.

In addition to the Barbirolli recording, the symphony has been recorded by the London Symphony Orchestra under Sir Edward Downes (RCA), the London Philharmonic Orchestra under Bryden Thomson (Chandos), the BBC Philharmonic with Vernon Handley (Chandos) and the Royal Scottish National Orchestra conducted by David Lloyd-Jones (Naxos). The original Barbirolli recording has been reissued several times by EMI Classics, and latterly by Dutton Vocalion.

For the second movement of his Concerto for Two Pianos and Orchestra, Ralph Vaughan Williams quoted the theme from the Epilogue of the third movement of Bax's symphony.

References

Symphonies by Arnold Bax
1929 compositions
Music dedicated to ensembles or performers